Prince Jerzy Zbaraski (b. 1574, d. 12 July 1631 in Kraków) was a Polish–Lithuanian szlachcic. Older brother of Krzysztof Zbaraski. Last of the Zbaraski family.

Jerzy was born in 1574. He was the son of Janusz Zbaraski and his wife Anna Czetwertyńska. His younger brother was Krzysztof Zbaraski.

In 1598 he accompanied the court of king Sigismund III Vasa on a visit to Sweden. Zbaraski supported Sigismund III Vasa during the Zebrzydowski Rebellion. He was Krajczy of the Crown since 1612, Podczaszy of the Crown since 1619, Castellan of Kraków since 1620 and Starost of Pinsk, Sokal, Radohoski, Żarnowiec.

He died suddenly on 12 July 1631 in Kraków.

He had no wives nor children. He was the last member of Zbaraski family.

Footnotes

External links
 Zbaraski in the Encyclopedia of Ukraine, vol. 5 (1993).
  Kasper Niesiecki, Korona polska przy złotej wolności starożytnymi wszystkich katedr, prowincji i rycerstwa klejnotami… — Lwów, 1743. — Т. IV. — S. 708–709
  Książęta Czetwertyńscy (01)

1574 births
1631 deaths
16th-century Polish nobility
Jerzy
People from Ternopil Oblast
17th-century Polish nobility